Wu Ziniu (born 31 October 1952), is a Chinese film director and a member of the "Fifth Generation" film movement, a movement of filmmakers who graduated from the Beijing Film Academy in the early 1980s. Unlike his better-known contemporaries, Zhang Yimou and Chen Kaige, who made their names with historical dramas, Wu Ziniu is best known for his early war films. His 1985 film on the Sino-Vietnamese War, Dove Tree, was the first film by a Fifth Generation director to be banned by the Chinese government.

Directorial career
A member of the 1982 graduating class of the Beijing Film Academy, Wu was assigned to the Xiaoxing Film Studio. There he directed four films, including the children's film, The Candidate, the war films Secret Decree and Dove Tree, and the drama, The Last Day of Winter. After The Last Day of Winter, Wu expanded to other studios, working with the August First Film Studio to produce the war film, Evening Bell, which, despite the heavy hand of censorship, managed to win several international awards, including the Silver Bear - Special Jury Prize at the 39th Berlin International Film Festival.

Throughout the late 1980s, Wu would continue to direct films, often highlighting the brutality of war and the effect on civilians, as in 1988's Joyous Heroes and its sequel Between Life and Death. With the 1990s, Wu would draw on foreign capital, primarily from Hong Kong to help produce his historical films Sparkling Fox and The Big Mill.

Filmography

Film

Television

References

External links
 
 
 Wu Ziniu at the Chinese Movie Database

Film directors from Sichuan
Writers from Leshan
Beijing Film Academy alumni
1952 births
Living people
Screenwriters from Sichuan